Santiago Metro Line 4 is one of the six lines that currently make up the Santiago Metro network in Santiago, Chile. It has 23 stations and 23.9 km of track. The line intersects with Line 1 at Tobalaba, with Line 3 at Plaza Egaña at northeast, and with Line 4A at Vicuña Mackenna and with Line 5 at Vicente Valdés in southeast. It will also intersect with the future Line 8 at Macul. Its distinctive colour on the network line map is blue.

Currently, it is the only line in the system to leave the Santiago Province, serving Puente Alto in the Cordillera Province.

In 2015, Line 4 accounted for 18.1% of all trips made on the metro system with a ridership of 328,200.

In October 2019, the line suspended operations as a result of the 2019 Santiago protests, however by now most of its stations have reopened.

History
The first section of the new Line 4 was opened to the public on November 30, 2005 by President Ricardo Lagos Escobar running between Tobalaba station and Grecia station and between Vicente Valdés station - Plaza de Puente Alto station. The gap in the line between Grecia station and Vicente Valdés station was initially covered by Transantiago buses.
Later, Los Presidentes station, Quilín station, Las Torres station, Macul station and Vicuña Mackenna station were opened to the public on March 2, 2006, connecting the first two sections.

On December 9, 2007, an express service began to run on Line 4 at peak times, stopping at certain stations only to allow for faster journeys.

On June 1, 2018 Chilean President Sebastián Piñera announced in the public account the extension of Line 4 to the sector of Bajos de Mena in Puente Alto that will be operational in 2026.

October 2019 protests

In October 2019, as a result of the protests caused by the rise in the subway fare, major damage occurred throughout the metro network. Line 4 was the most heavily damaged line out of all the metro's services. The Los Quillayes, San José de la Estrella, Macul, Protectora de la Infancia, Trinidad and Elisa Correa stations were completely burned; the latter two stations suffered the worst amount of damage to their structures and tracks, which would prevent normal operation of Line 4 for a period lasting 10 to 12 months. Line 4 partially reopened between Tobalaba and Quilín stations on October 28.

On November 6, the electrification of the tracks in the section between the stations Las Torres and Plaza de Puente Alto was restored, which suffered considerable damage, while evaluating the repairs to the line. On November 15, 2019, it was announced that service on the entirety of Line 4 would resume (with the exception of Vicuña Mackenna, Vicente Valdés, Hospital Sótero del Río, Las Mercedes and Plaza de Puente Alto stations) from November 18. On August 12, 2020, the Macul station was reopened. On September 14, the Elisa Correa, Los Quillayes and San José de la Estrella stations were reopened. Finally, on September 25, the Trinidad and Protectora de la Infancia stations were reopened, thus completing 100% operation at all stations.

Future
There is an expansion project planned for Line 4 proposing to extend the line to the north through Kennedy Avenue, benefitting the neighbourhoods of Las Condes and Vitacura and allowing an easier access to shopping centres located in Kennedy Avenue. Another proposal is considering connecting the Huechuraba business district with Tobalaba station, passing under the Costanera Center and San Cristóbal Hill.

Communes served by Line 4

Line 4 serves the following communes from south to north:
 Puente Alto
 La Florida
 Peñalolen
 Macul
 Nuñoa
 La Reina
 Providencia
 Las Condes

Tren Expreso (Express Service) 

The skip-stop express service works during peak hours and allows trains to stop at alternate stations, reducing the number of stops and the duration of journeys. The stations on the line are divided into “green route” stations, “red route” stations and “common” stations (Spanish: estación común), where all trains stop and allow passengers to switch between red and green routes. The express service works from Monday to Friday, between 6am - 9am, 12pm - 3pm and 6pm - 9pm.

Red Route Stations 
 Príncipe de Gales
 Los Orientales
 Los Presidentes
 Las Torres
 Trinidad
 Los Quillayes
 Las Mercedes

Green Route Stations 
 Cristóbal Colón
 Simón Bolívar
 Grecia
 Quilín
 Rojas Magallanes
 San José de la Estrella
 Protectora de la Infancia

Common Stations 
There are 9 stations where both red and green route trains stop. They are the busiest stations and give commuters the chance to change between routes.

 Tobalaba  
 Francisco Bilbao
 Plaza Egaña 
 Macul
 Vicuña Mackenna 
 Vicente Valdés 
 Elisa Correa
 Hospital Sótero del Río
 Plaza de Puente Alto

Stations
Note: in this wikitable a "Province" column is also added, as the Line 4 is the only Line to leave the Santiago Province, with five stations in the Cordillera Province.

Line 4 stations from south to north are:

Line 4 data sheet
 Terminal Communes:Las Condes/Providencia – Puente Alto
 Track:
 Tobalaba Avenue: 3 stations
 Ossa Avenue: 3 stations
 Américo Vespucio: 7 stations
 Vicuña Mackenna Avenue: 6 stations.
 Concha y Toro Avenue: 5 stations.
 Construction Method:
 Tobalaba – Grecia: Underground.
 Los Presidentes: At grade.
 Quilín: Open cut.
 Las Torres: At grade.
 Macul: Viaduct.
 Vicuña Mackenna – Vicente Valdés: Underground.
 Rojas Magallanes – Protectora de la Infancia: Viaduct.
 Las Mercedes – Plaza de Puente Alto: Underground.
 Opening Dates:
 Tobalaba – Grecia: November 2005.
 Vicente Valdés - Plaza de Puente Alto: November 2005.
 Los Presidentes -Vicuña Mackenna: March 2006.
 Plaza de Puente Alto - Bajos de Mena: 2028.

See also 
List of metro systems
Rail transport in Chile
Transantiago

References

External links
 Metro S.A.
 UrbanRail.net/Santiago
 Santiago Metro Map
 Tarjeta Bip! contactless cards
 Plan and Authority of Transit of Santiago de Chile, Transantiago
 Santiago Metro in Wikipedia in Spanish

 
Railway lines in highway medians
750 V DC railway electrification